John H. Clough  was an English professional footballer who made nearly 500 appearances as a goalkeeper in the Football League, most notably for Bradford Park Avenue. After retiring as a player, he served Mansfield Town as a trainer between 1939 and 1949.

Personal life 
Clough served in the Royal Army Medical Corps during the First World War. He was awarded the Military Medal for "rendering first aid and bringing in wounded comrades from the front lines under continuous enemy shell fire" during the Battle of the Somme in September 1916. In October 1918, Clough was awarded a bar to his Military Medal for gallantry and devotion to duty in action.

Career statistics

Honours 
Bradford Park Avenue
Football League Third Division North: 1927–28

References

People from Murton, County Durham
Footballers from County Durham
English footballers
Association football goalkeepers
Middlesbrough F.C. players
Bradford (Park Avenue) A.F.C. players
Brentford F.C. players
Mansfield Town F.C. players
English Football League players
Rotherham United F.C. players
Mansfield Town F.C. non-playing staff
Year of death missing
Recipients of the Military Medal
1898 births
British Army personnel of World War I
Royal Army Medical Corps soldiers